The economy of Spain is a highly developed social market economy. It is the world's sixteenth-largest by nominal GDP and the sixth-largest in Europe. Spain is a member of the European Union and the eurozone, as well as the Organization for Economic Co-operation and Development and the World Trade Organization. In 2021, Spain was the twentieth-largest exporter in the world and the sixteenth-largest importer. Spain is listed 27th in the United Nations Human Development Index and 37th in GDP per capita by the World Bank. According to The Economist in 2005, Spain had the world's 10th highest quality of life. Some of the main areas of economic activity are the automotive industry, medical technology, chemicals, shipbuilding, tourism, and the textile industry.

Following the financial crisis of 2007–2008, the Spanish economy plunged into recession, entering a cycle of negative macroeconomic performance. Compared to the EU's and US's average, the Spanish economy entered recession later (the economy was still growing by 2008), but it stayed there longer. The economic boom of the 2000s was reversed, leaving over a quarter of Spain's workforce unemployed by 2012. In aggregated terms, the Spanish GDP contracted by almost 9% during the 2009–2013 period. The economic situation started improving by 2013–2014. By then, the country managed to reverse the record trade deficit which had built up during the boom years. It attained a trade surplus in 2013, after three decades of running a trade deficit. The surplus kept strengthening during 2014 and 2015.

In 2015, the Spanish GDP grew by 3.2%, a rate not seen since 2007, the last year before the world financial crisis struck. This growth rate was the highest among the larger EU economies that year. In just two years (2014–2015), the Spanish economy recovered 85% of the GDP lost during the 2009–2013 recession. This success led some international analysts to refer to Spain's current recovery as "the showcase for structural reform efforts". Strong GDP growth was registered also in 2016, with the country growing twice as fast as the eurozone average. In this regard, the Spanish economy was forecast to remain the best-performing major economy in the eurozone in 2017. Spain's unemployment rate fell substantially from 2013 to 2017. The real unemployment rate is much lower, as there is an estimation of millions of people working in the grey market, people who count as unemployed or inactive yet still perform jobs. Although estimates of the hidden economy vary, the real Spanish GDP may be around 20% bigger as it is estimated that the underground economy of Spain moves annually 190 billion Euros (US$224 billion). Among high income European countries, only Italy and Greece are estimated to have larger underground economies than Spain. Thus Spain may have higher purchasing power as well as a smaller gini coefficient than shown in official numbers. In 2012, the Spanish government officially requested a credit from the European Stability Mechanism to restructure its banking sector in the face of a financial crisis. The ESM approved up to €100 billion in assistance, although, in the end, Spain only drew €41.3 billion. The ESM programme for Spain ended with the full repayment of the credit drawn, eighteen months later.

History

During the first decades of the twentieth century, Spain experienced an accelerated growth of its industrial labor force and urban population; the economy became less agrarian as the process of urbanization spread after 1910. The largest sector was still agriculture but saw declines, along with fishing, relative to the share of active population engaged in the activity. The fastest growing sector at that time was services.

When Spain joined the EEC in 1986 its GDP per capita was about 72% of the average of its members.

At the second half of the 1990s, the conservative government of former prime minister Jose María Aznar had worked successfully to gain admission to the group of countries joining the euro in 1999.

By 2007, Spain had achieved a GDP per capita of 105% of European Union's average due to its own economic development and the EU enlargements to 28 members, which placed it slightly ahead of Italy (103%). Three regions were included in the leading EU group exceeding 125% of the GDP per capita average level: the Basque Country , Madrid, and Navarre. According to calculations by the German newspaper Die Welt in 2008, Spain's economy had been on course to overtake countries like Germany in per capita income by 2011. in October 2006, Unemployment stood at 7.6% which compared favorably to many other European countries, and especially with the early 1990s when it stood at over 20%. In the past,Spain's economy had included high inflation  and it has always had a large underground economy.

The turn to growth during the 1997-2007 period produced a real estate bubble fed by historically low interest rates, massive rates of foreign investment (during that period Spain had become a favorite of other European investment banks) and an immense surge in immigration. At its peak in 2007, construction had expanded to 15% of the total gross domestic product (GDP) of the country and 12% of total employment. During that time Spain capital inflows –including short term speculative investment–  financed a large trade deficit.

The downside of the real estate boom was a corresponding rise in the levels of private debt, both of households and of businesses; as prospective homeowners had struggled to meet asking prices, the average level of household debt tripled in less than a decade. This placed especially great pressure upon lower to middle income groups; by 2005 the median ratio of indebtedness to income had grown to 125%, due primarily to expensive boom time mortgages that now often exceed the value of the property.

Noticeable progress continued until early 2008, when the global financial crisis burst Spain's property bubble.

A European Commission forecast had predicted Spain would enter the world's late 2000s recession by the end of 2008. At the time, Spain's Economy Minister was quoted saying, "Spain is facing its deepest recession in half a century". Spain's government forecast the unemployment rate would rise to 16% in 2009. The ESADE business school predicted 20%. By 2017, Spain's GDP per capita had fallen back to 95% of the European Union's average.

Economic and financial crisis, 2008-2012 

Spain had continued on the path of economic growth when the ruling party changed in 2004, maintaining robust GDP growth during the first term of prime minister José Luis Rodríguez Zapatero, even though some problems in the Spanish economy were becoming evident. According to the Financial Times, Spain's rapidly growing trade deficit, had reached 10% of the country's GDP by the summer of 2008, the "loss of competitiveness against its main trading partners" and, also, as a part of the latter, an inflation rate which had been traditionally higher than the one of its European partners, back then especially affected by house price increases of 150% from 1998 and a growing family indebtedness (115%) chiefly related to the Spanish Real Estate boom and rocketing oil prices.

In April 2008, the Spanish government official GDP growth forecast was 2.3% but was revised down by the Spanish Ministry of Economy to 1.6. Studies by most independent forecasters estimated that the rate had actually dropped to 0.8% instead, below the strong 3% plus GDP annual growth rates during the 1997–2007 decade. During the third quarter of 2008 the national GDP contracted for the first time in 15 years. In February 2009, it was confirmed that Spain, along other European economies, had officially entered recession.

In July 2009, the IMF worsened the estimates for Spain's 2009 contraction, to minus 4% of GDP for the year (close to the European average of minus 4.6%.) It estimated a further 0.8% contraction of the Spanish economy for 2010.
In 2011, the deficit reached a high of 8.5%. For 2016 the deficit objective of the government was around 4%, falling to 2.9% for 2017. The European Commission has demanded 3.9% for 2016 and 2.5% for 2017.

Property boom and bust, 2003–2014 

The adoption of the Euro in 2002 had driven down long-term interest rates, prompting a surge in mortgage lending that jumped more than fourfold from 2000 to its 2010 apex. The growth in the Spanish property market, which had begun in 1997, accelerated and within a few years had developed into a property bubble, financed largely by regional banks, known as "Cajas", which are regional savings banks under the oversight of regional governments, and fed by the historically low interest rates and a massive growth of immigration. Fueling this trend, the Spanish economy was being credited for having avoided the virtual zero growth rate of some of its largest partners in the EU in the months previous to the global Great Recession.

Over the five years ending 2005, Spain's economy had created more than half of all the new jobs in the European Union . At the top of its property boom, Spain was building more houses than Germany, France and the U.K. combined. Home prices soared by 71% between 2003 and 2008, in tandem with the credit explosion.

The bubble imploded in 2008, causing the collapse of Spain's large property related and construction sectors, causing mass layoffs, and a collapsing domestic demand for goods and services. Unemployment shot up.

At first, Spain's banks and financial services avoided the early crisis of their international counterparts. However, as the recession deepened and property prices slid, the growing bad debts of the smaller regional savings banks, the "cajas", forced the intervention of Spain's central bank and government through a stabilization and consolidation program, taking over or consolidating regional "cajas" and finally receiving a bank bailout from the European Central Bank in 2012 aimed specifically for the banking business and "cajas" in particular.

Following the 2008 peak, home prices plunged by 31%, before bottoming out in late 2014.

Euro debt crisis, 2010-2012

In the first weeks of 2010, renewed anxiety about the excessive levels of debt in some EU countries and, more generally, about the health of the euro has spread from Ireland and Greece to Portugal, and to a lesser extent in Spain.

Many economists recommended a battery of policies to control the surging public debt caused by the recessionary collapse of tax revenues, combining drastic austerity measures with higher taxes. Some senior German policy makers went as far as to say that emergency bailouts should include harsh penalties to EU aid recipients such as Greece. It has been noted that the Spanish government budget was in surplus in the years immediately before the global financial crisis and that its debt was not considered excessive.

At the beginning of 2010, Spain's public debt as a percentage of GDP was still less than those of Britain, France or Germany. However, commentators pointed out that Spain's recovery was fragile, that the public debt was growing quickly, that troubled regional banks may need large bailouts, growth prospects were poor and therefore limiting revenue and that the central government has limited control over the spending of the regional governments. Under the structure of shared governmental responsibilities that has evolved since 1975, much responsibility for spending had been given back to the regions. The central government found itself in the difficult position of trying to gain support for unpopular spending cuts from the recalcitrant regional governments.

On 23 May 2010, the government announced further austerity measures, consolidating the ambitious plans announced in January.

As of September 2011, Spanish banks hold a record high of €142 billion of Spanish national bonds. December 2011 bond auctions are "very likely to be covered" according to JPMorgan Chase.

Till Q2 2012, Spanish banks were allowed to report real estate related assets in higher non-market price by regulators. Investors who bought into such banks must be aware. Spanish houses cannot be sold at land book value after being vacant over a period of years.

Employment crisis (2008 - present)

After having completed large improvements over the second half of the 1990s and during the 2000s, Spain attained in 2007 its record low unemployment rate, at about 8%, with a few regions on the brink of full employment. Then Spain suffered a severe setback from October 2008, when it saw its unemployment rate surge to 1996 levels. During the period October 2007 – October 2008 the unemployment surge exceeded that of past economic crises, including that of 1993. In particular, during the month of October 2008, Spain suffered its worst unemployment rise ever recorded.
Even though the sheer size of Spain's underground economy masks to some extent the real situation, employment has been a long term weakness of the Spanish economy. By 2014 the structural unemployment rate was estimated at 18%.
By July 2009, it had shed 1.2 million jobs in one year. The oversized building and housing related industries were contributing greatly to the rising unemployment numbers. From 2009 thousands of established immigrants began to leave, although some did maintain residency in Spain due to poor conditions in their country of origin. In all, by early 2013 Spain reached an unprecedented unemployment record at about 27%.

In May 2012 a radical labor reform made for a more flexible labor market, facilitating layoffs with a view to enhancing corporate's confidence.

Youth crisis 
During the early 1990s, Spain experienced a period of economic crisis as a result of a larger, Europe-wide economic episode that led to a rise in unemployment rates. Many young adults in Spain found themselves trapped in a cycle of temporary jobs, which resulted in the creation of a secondary class of workers through reduced wages, job stability and advancement opportunities. As a result, many Spaniards, predominantly unmarried young adults, emigrated to other countries in order to pursue job opportunities and raise their standard of life, which left only a small amount of young adults living below the poverty line in Spain. Spain experienced another economic crisis during the 2000s, which also prompted a rise in Spanish citizens emigrating to neighboring countries with more job stability and better economic standings.

Youth unemployment remains a concern in Spain, prompting suggestions of labor market programs and job-search assistance like matching youth skills with businesses. This would improve Spain's weakened youth labor market, and their school to work transition as youth have found it difficult to find long-term employment.

Employment recovery
The labor market reform started a trend of setting successive positive employment records. By the second quarter of 2014, the Spanish economy had reversed its negative trend and started creating jobs for the first time since 2008.
The second quarter reversal had been sudden and extraordinary considering that the number of jobs created set an absolute positive record since such quarterly employment statistics are maintained in 1964. Labor reform did seem to play an important role; one piece of evidence cited was that Spain had started creating jobs at lower rates of GDP growth than before: in previous cycles, employment rose when growth hit 2%, this time the gain came during a year when GDP had expanded by just 1.2%.

Greater than expected GDP growth paved the way for further declines in the unemployment rate. Since 2014 Spain has been registering steady annual fall in the official jobless figure. During 2016, unemployment in Spain experienced the steepest fall on record to date. By the end of that year, Spain had recovered 1.7m of the more than 3.5m jobs lost over the course of the recession. By Q4 2016 Spanish unemployment had fallen to 18.6%, the lowest rate in seven years. In April 2017 the country recorded its biggest drop in jobless claimants for a single month in the entire historical series to date. Job creation kept speeding up; in this regard, May 2017 was the best May to date in terms of social security affiliations since this record was started in 2001 and during that month jobless claims fell to the lowest figure since June 2009.

In the second quarter 2017, unemployment fell to 17%, below 4 million for the first time since 2008, with the country experiencing its steepest quarterly decline in unemployment on record to date (series starts in 1964). In 2018, at 14.6% the unemployment rate did not exceed the 15% threshold for the first time since 2008 when the crisis began.

As of 2017, trade unions, left, and center-left parties have criticized and wanted the labor reform to be revoked, on grounds that it tilts the balance of power too far towards employers. Besides, most new contracts are temporary.

In 2019, Pedro Sánchez's socialist government increased the minimum wage by 22% in an attempt to boost hiring and encourage spending. Members of the opposition argued that this increase from €858 to €1050 a month would negatively affect 1.2 million workers due to their employers being unable to cover the aforementioned raise.

Reduction of European Union funds

Capital contributions from the EU, which had contributed significantly to the economic empowerment of Spain since joining the EEC, have decreased considerably since 1990 due to the economic standardization in relation to other countries and the effects of the EU's enlargement. On the one hand, agricultural funds from the Common Agricultural Policy of the European Union (CAP) are now spread across more countries.
On the other hand, with 2004's and 2007's enlargement of the European Union, less developed countries joined the EU, lowering the average income per capita (or GDP per capita), so that Spanish regions which were considered to be relatively less developed, became in the European average or even above it. Spain has gradually become a net contributor of funds for less developed countries of the Union as opposed to receiving funds.

Economic recovery (2014–2020) 
During the economic downturn, Spain significantly reduced imports, increased exports and kept attracting growing numbers of tourists; as a result, after three decades of running a trade deficit the country attained in 2013 a trade surplus which has strengthened during 2014 and 2015.

With a 3.2% increase in 2015, the Spanish GDP growth was the highest among larger EU economies that year. In just two years (2014–2015) the Spanish economy had recovered 85% of the GDP lost during the 2009-2013 recession, which got some international analysts to refer to Spain's current recovery as "the showcase for structural reform efforts".

By Q2 2016 the Spanish economy had been accumulating 12 consecutive quarters of growth, managing to consistently outperform the rest of the Euro area. Such growth had continued, with the Spanish economy outperforming expectations and growing 3.2 per cent in 2016, almost twice as fast as the Euro zone average. One of the main drivers of economic recovery was international trade, in turn sparked by dramatic gains in labor productivity.  Exports have shot up, from around 25% (2008) to 33% of GDP (2016) on the back of an internal devaluation (the country's wage bill halved in the 2008-2016 period), a search for new markets and a recent mild recovery of the European economy.

The Spanish economy was forecast to remain the best-performing major economy in the Euro zone in 2017 and in the second quarter of 2017 Spain had recovered all the GDP lost during the economic crisis, exceeding for the first time the output level that had been reached in 2008.

By 2017, following several months of prices picking up, homeowners who had been renting during the economic slump had started to put their properties back on the sales market. In this regard, home sales are expected to return in 2017 to pre-crisis (2008) level. In all, the Spanish real estate market was experiencing a new boom, this time in the rental sector. Out of 50 provinces and compared to May 2007, the National Statistics Institute has recorded higher rent levels in 48 provinces, with the 10 most populated accumulating rent inflation between 5% and 15% since 2007. The phenomenon is most visible in big cities such as Barcelona or Madrid, which are seeing new record average prices, partially fueled by short-term rentals to tourists.

Data 
The following table shows the main economic indicators in 1980–2021 (plus IMF estimates for 2022–2027 in italics). Inflation below 5% is in green.

Banking system

Spanish private commercial banks played a central role in Spain's economic development, benefiting from their role as the state's creditor in the 19th century, from their ability to monetize public debt, and from state-sanctioned oligopolistic arrangements that lasted from the beginning of the 20th century until the late 1980s, when European rules forced a liberalization of the sector.  It has been argued that the favorable treatment received by the main Spanish commercial banks and their close relationship to the Bank of Spain (Banco de España) following the end of the Franco regime allowed for a public-private partnership to restructure the large commercial banks into two large banks (Santander and BBVA) with the purpose of preparing the private institutions for international competition and external expansion once the European banking market was integrated in 1992 Alongside this financial mercantilism benefiting the commercial banking sector, Spanish regulators also allowed for the vast expansion of not for profit savings banks sponsored by regional governments who became heavily exposed to the housing mortgage and real estate development sectors during the Spanish economic boom of 1999–2007.

Prior to 2010, the Spanish banking system had been credited as one of the most solid of all western banking systems in coping with the ongoing worldwide liquidity crisis, thanks to the country's conservative banking rules and practices. Banks were required to have high capital provisions and to demand various guarantees and securities from intending borrowers. This allowed the banks, particularly the geographically and industrially diversified large banks like BBVA and Santander, to weather the real estate deflation better than expected. Indeed, Spain's large commercial banks have been able to capitalize on their strong position to buy up distressed banking assets elsewhere in Europe and in the United States.

Nevertheless, with the unprecedented crisis of the country's real estate sector, smaller local savings banks ("Cajas"), had been delaying the registering of bad loans, especially those backed by houses and land, to avoid declaring losses. In June 2009 the Spanish government set its banking bailout and reconstruction fund, the Fondo de reestructuración ordenada bancaria (FROB), known in English as Fund for Orderly Bank Restructuring. In the event, State intervention of local savings banks due to default risk was less than feared. On 22 May 2010, the Banco de España took over "CajaSur", as part of a national program to put the country's smaller banks on a firm financial basis. In December 2011, the Spanish central bank, Banco de España (equivalent of the US Federal Reserve), forcibly took over "Caja Mediterraneo", also known as CAM, (a regional savings bank) to prevent its financial collapse.
The international accounting firm, PricewaterhouseCoopers, estimated an imbalance between CAM's assets and debts of €3,500 million, not counting the industrial corporation. The troubled situation reached its peak with the partial nationalization of Bankia in May 2012. By then it was becoming clear that the mounting real estate losses of the savings banks were undermining confidence in the country's government bonds, thus aggravating a sovereign debt crisis.

In early June 2012, Spain requested European funding of €41 billion "to recapitalize Spanish banks that need it". It was not a sovereign bailout in that the funds were used only for the restructuring of the banking sector a full-fledged bailout for an economy the size of the Spanish would have reached ten or twelve times that amount).
In return for the credit line etended by the EMS, there were no tax or macroeconomic conditions.

As of 2017 the cost of restructuring Spain's bankrupt savings banks were estimated to have been €60.7 billion, of which nearly €41.8 billion was put up by the state through the FROB and the rest by the banking sector. The total cost will not be fully understood until those lenders still controlled by the State (Bankia and BMN) are newly privatized. In this regard, by early 2017 the Spanish government was considering a merger of both banks before privatizing the combined bank to recoup an estimated 400 million euros of their bailout costs. During the course of this transformation, most regional savings banks such as the CAM, Catalunya Banc, Banco de Valencia, Novagalicia Banco, Unnim Banc or Cajasur have since been absorbed by the bigger, more international, Spanish banks, which imposed better management practices.

As of 2022, Spanish banks have halved their number of branches to about 20,000 in the decade since the financial crisis and the subsequent international bailout in 2012. The remaining banks have reduced retail opening hours and pushed online banking. A retired urologist with Parkinson's disease gathered more than 600,000 signatures in an online petition "I'm Old, Not an Idiot" asking banks and other institutions to serve all citizens, and not discriminate the oldest and most vulnerable members.

Prices

Due to the lack of own resources, Spain has to import all of its fossil fuels. Besides, until the 2008 crisis, Spain's recent performance had shown an inflationary tendency and an inflationary gap compared to other EMU countries, affecting the country's overall productivity. Moreover, when Spain joined the euro zone, it lost the recourse of resorting to competitive devaluations, risking a permanent and cumulative loss of competitive due to inflation. In a scenario of record oil prices by the mid 2000s this meant much added pressure to the inflation rate. In June 2008 the inflation rate reached a 13-year high at 5.00%.

Then, with the dramatic decrease of oil prices in the second half of 2008 plus the manifest bursting of the real estate bubble, concerns quickly shifted over to the risk of deflation, as Spain recorded in January 2009 its lowest inflation rate in 40 years, followed shortly afterwards, in March 2009 by a negative inflation rate for the first time since the gathering of these statistics started. During the 2009−early 2016 period, apart from temporary minor oil shocks, the Spanish economy has generally oscillated between slightly negative to near-zero inflation rates. Analysts reckoned that this was not synonymous with deflation, due to the fact that GDP had been growing since 2014, domestic consumption had rebounded as well and, especially, because core inflation remained slightly positive.

In 2017, moderate inflation between 1-2%, still below the ECB's target, returned as the impact of cheaper fuel prices faded and economic recovery took hold.

Economic strengths

Since the 1990s some Spanish companies have gained multinational status, often expanding their activities in culturally close Latin America, Eastern Europe and Asia.  Spain is the second biggest foreign investor in Latin America, after the United States. Spanish companies have also expanded into Asia, especially China and India. This early global expansion gave Spanish companies a competitive advantage over some of Spain's competitors and European neighbors. Another contribution to the success of Spanish firms may have to do with booming interest toward Spanish language and culture in Asia and Africa, but also a corporate culture that learned to take risks in unstable markets.

Spanish companies invested in fields like biotechnology and pharmaceuticals, or renewable energy (Iberdrola is the world's largest renewable energy operator), technology companies like Telefónica, Abengoa, Mondragon Corporation, Movistar, Gamesa, Hisdesat, Indra, train manufacturers like CAF and Talgo, global corporations such as the textile company Inditex, petroleum companies like Repsol and infrastructure firms. Six of the ten biggest international construction firms specialising in transport are Spanish, lincluding Ferrovial, Acciona, ACS, OHL and FCC.

Spain is equipped with a solid banking system as well, including two global systemically important banks, Banco Santander and BBVA.

Infrastructure
In the 2012–13 edition of the Global Competitiveness Report Spain was listed 10th in the world in terms of first-class infrastructure. It is the 5th EU country with best infrastructure and ahead of countries like Japan or the United States. In particular, the country is a leader in the field of high-speed rail, having developed the second longest network in the world (only behind China) and leading high-speed projects with Spanish technology around the world.

The Spanish infrastructure concession companies, lead 262 transport infrastructure worldwide, representing 36% of the total, according to the latest rankings compiled by the publication Public Works Financing. The top three global occupy Spanish companies: ACS, Global Vía and Abertis, according to the ranking of companies by number of concessions for roads, railways, airports and ports in construction or operation in October 2012. Considering the investment, the first world infrastructure concessionaire is Ferrovial-Cintra, with 72,000 million euros, followed closely by ACS, with 70,200 million. Among the top ten in the world are also the Spanish Sacyr (21,500 million), FCC and Global Vía (with 19,400 million) and OHL (17,870 million).

During 2013 Spanish civil engineering companies signed contracts around the world for a total of 40 billion euros, setting a new record for the national industry.

The port of Valencia in Spain is the busiest seaport in the Mediterranean basin, 5th busiest in Europe and 30th busiest in the world. There are four other Spanish ports in the ranking of the top 125 busiest world seaports (Algeciras, Barcelona, Las Palmas, and Bilbao); as a result, Spain is tied with Japan in the third position of countries leading this ranking.

Export growth

During the boom years, Spain had built up a trade deficit eventually amounting a record equivalent to 10% of GDP (2007) and the external debt ballooned to the equivalent of 170% of GDP, one of the highest among Western economies. Then, during the economic downturn, Spain reduced significantly imports due to domestic consumption shrinking while – despite the global slowdown – it has been increasing exports and kept attracting growing numbers of tourists. Spanish exports grew by 4.2% in 2013, the highest rate in the European Union. As a result, after three decades of running a trade deficit Spain attained in 2013 a trade surplus. Export growth was driven by capital goods and the automotive sector and the forecast was to reach a surplus equivalent to 2.5% of GDP in 2014.
Exports in 2014 were 34% of GDP, up from 24% in 2009.
The trade surplus attained in 2013 has been consolidated in 2014 and 2015.

Despite slightly declining exports from fellow EU countries in the same period, Spanish exports continued to grow and in the first half of 2016 the country beat its own record to date exporting goods for 128,041 million euros; from the total, almost 67% were exported to other EU countries. During this same period, from the 70 members of the World Trade Organization (whose combined economies amount to 90% of global GDP), Spain was the country whose exports had grown the most.

In 2016, exports of goods hit historical highs despite a global slowdown in trade, making up for 33% of the total GDP (by comparison, exports represent 12% of GDP in the United States, 18% in Japan, 22% in China or 45% in Germany).

In all, by 2017 foreign sales have been rising every year since 2010, with a degree of unplanned import substitution -a rather unusual feat for Spain when in an expansive phase- which points to structural competitive gains. According to the most recent 2017 data, about 65% of the country's exports go to other EU members.

Sectors
The Spanish benchmark stock market index is the IBEX 35, which as of 2016 is led by banking (including Banco Santander and BBVA), clothing (Inditex), telecommunications (Telefónica) and energy (Iberdrola).

External trade
Traditionally until 2008, most exports and imports from Spain were held with the countries of the European Union: France, Germany, Italy, UK and Portugal.

In recent years foreign trade has taken refuge outside the European Union. Spain's main customers are Latin America, Asia (Japan, China, India), Africa (Morocco, Algeria, Egypt) and the United States. Principal trading partners in Asia are Japan, China, South Korea, Taiwan. In Africa, countries producing oil (Nigeria, Algeria, Libya) are important partners, as well as Morocco. Latin American countries are very important trading partners, like Argentina, Mexico, Cuba (tourism), Colombia, Brazil, Chile (food products) and Mexico, Venezuela and Argentina (petroleum).  

After the crisis that began in 2008 and the fall of the domestic market, Spain (since 2010) it has turned outwards widely increasing the export supply and export amounts. It has diversified its traditional destinations and has grown significantly in product sales of medium and high technology, including highly competitive markets like the US and Asia.

Tourism

During the last four decades Spain's foreign tourist industry has grown into the second-biggest in the world. A 2015 survey by the World Economic Forum proclaimed the country's tourism industry as the world's most competitive. The 2017 survey repeated this finding.

By 2018 the country was the second most visited country in the world, overtaking the US and not far behind France. With 83.7 million visitors, the country broke in 2019 its own tourism record for the tenth year in a row.

The size of the business has gone from approximately €40 billion in 2006 to about €77 billion in 2016. In 2015 the total value of foreign and domestic tourism came to nearly 5% of the country's GDP and provided employment for about 2 million people.

The headquarters of the World Tourism Organization are located in Madrid.

Automotive industry

The automotive industry is one of the largest employers in the country. In 2015 Spain was the 8th largest automobile producer country in the world and the 2nd largest car manufacturer in Europe after Germany.

By 2016, the automotive industry was generating 8.7 percent of Spain's gross domestic product, employing about nine percent of the manufacturing industry. By 2008 the automobile industry was the 2nd most exported industry while in 2015 about 80% of the total production was for export.

German companies poured €4.8 billion into Spain in 2015, making the country the second-largest destination for German foreign direct investment behind only the U.S. The lion's share of that investment —€4 billion— went to the country's auto industry.

Energy

In 2008, Spanish electricity consumption was an average of 6,523 kWh/person. Spanish electricity usage constituted 88% of the EU15 average (EU15: 7,409 kWh/person), and 73% of the OECD average (8,991 kWh/person).

Spain is one of the world leaders in renewable energies, both as a producer of renewable energy itself and as an exporter of such technology. In 2013 it became the first country ever in the world to have wind power as its main source of energy.

Agribusiness

Agribusiness has been another segment growing aggressively over the last few years. At slightly over 40 billion euros, in 2015 agribusiness exports accounted for 3% of GDP and over 15% of the total Spanish exports.

The boom was shaped during the 2004-2014 period, when Spain's agribusiness exports grew by 95% led by pork, wine and olive oil. By 2012 Spain was by far the biggest producer of olive oil in the world, accounting for 50% of the total production worldwide. By 2013 the country became the world's leading producer of wine; in 2014 and 2015 Spain was the world's biggest wine exporter. However, poor marketing and low margins remain an issue, as shown by the fact that the main importers of Spanish olive oil and wine (Italy and France, respectively) buy bulk Spanish produce which is then bottled and sold under Italian or French labels, often for a significant markup.

Spain is the largest producer and exporter in the EU of citrus fruit (oranges, lemons and small citrus fruits), peaches and apricots. It is also the largest producer and exporter of strawberries in the EU.

Food retail 
In 2020, the food distribution sector was dominated by Mercadona (24.5% market share), followed by Carrefour (8.4%), Lidl (6.1%), DIA (5.8), Eroski (4.8), Auchan (3.4%), regional distributors (14.3%) and other (32.7%).

Mining 

In 2019, the country was the 7th largest producer of gypsum and the 10th world's largest producer of potash, in addition to being the 15th largest world producer of salt.

Copper (of which the country is the second producer in Europe) is primarily extracted in the Iberian Pyrite Belt.

The province of Granada features two mines of Celestine, making the country a major producer of strontium concentrates.

Mergers and acquisitions 
Between 1985 and 2018 around 23,201 deals have been announced where Spanish companies participated either as the acquirer or the target. These deals cumulate to an overall value of 1,935 bil. USD (1,571.8 bil. EUR).
Here is a list of the top 10 deals with Spanish participation:

See also 
 List of largest Spanish companies
 Automotive industry in Spain
 Tourism in Spain
 Agriculture in Spain
 Spanish Miracle
 Economic history of Spain
 Asian immigrants and the economy of Spain

References and notes

External links

 National Debt
 Spanish Banks Review
 Comprehensive current and historical economic data

Statistical resources
 Banco de España (Spanish Central Bank); features the latest and in depth statistics
 Statistical Institute of Andalusia
 National Institute of Statistics 
 Statistical Institute of Catalonia
 Statistical Institute of Galicia
 OECD's Spain country Web site and OECD Economic Survey of Spain
 World Bank Summary Trade Statistics Spain
 Tariffs applied by Spain as provided by ITC's ITC Market Access Map , an online database of customs tariffs and market requirements

Further reading
 Article: Investing in Spain by Nicholas Vardy – September 2006. A global investor's discussion of Spain's economic boom.
 The Pain in Spain: On May Day, Nearly 1 in 5 are Jobless by Andrés Caca, The Christian Science Monitor, 1 May 2009
 Alternatives to Fiscal Austerity in Spain from the Center for Economic and Policy Research, July 2010
 Starting a Business in Spain  Steps to Starting a Limited Company in Spain
 
 The Catalan economy in the European context

 
Spain
Spain
Spain
Spain
Economies of Europe